Bjæring was a legendary chieftain who, according to local legends, were buried in the Bjærum grave  (Bjærumfunnet) in Hægebostad, Agder, Norway. The grave has been dated to the Migration Period between AD 200 and 550.

References

Other sources
Stylegar,  Frans-Arne (2007) Farmers, Mariners, and Lords of Long-ago - Archaeology and Pre-history in the Agder region (Vest-Agder County Council)

Tumuli
Legendary Norsemen